Slavko Kodrnja (1911–1970) was a footballer who played as a forward. Internationally, he played for Yugoslavia and the Independent State of Croatia.

Club career
In the 1939–40 season of the Portuguese league, he was the top scorer, tied with Fernando Peyroteo. He won the 1942 Croatian championship with Concordia Zagreb.

International career
Kodrnja made his debut for Yugoslavia during the 1933 Balkan Cup match against Greece, immediately scoring a hat-trick. He made a total of four appearances for Yugoslavia, and also scored four goals. However, with the establishment of the Independent State of Croatia, a World War II-era puppet state of Nazi Germany, he began playing for the Croatia national team in 1942. His final international was an April 1943 friendly match against Slovakia.

Honours

Player
Concordia Zagreb
Kingdom of Yugoslavia First League: 1931–32
Croatian First League: 1942

Porto
Primeira Divisão: 1939–40

Individual
Bola de Prata: 1939–40

Manager
Borac Banja Luka
Yugoslav Third League: 1952–53

Ethiopia
African Cup of Nations silver medal: 1957
African Cup of Nations bronze medal: 1959

References

External links
Profile at National Football Teams
Profile at reprezentacija.rs

1911 births
1970 deaths
Footballers from Zagreb
Association football forwards
Yugoslav footballers
Yugoslavia international footballers
Croatian footballers
Croatia international footballers
Dual internationalists (football)
HŠK Concordia players
BSC Young Boys players
AS Saint-Étienne players
FC Antibes players
FC Porto players
Yugoslav First League players
Ligue 1 players
Primeira Liga players
Yugoslav expatriate footballers
Expatriate footballers in Switzerland
Yugoslav expatriate sportspeople in Switzerland
Expatriate footballers in France
Yugoslav expatriate sportspeople in France
Expatriate footballers in Portugal
Yugoslav expatriate sportspeople in Portugal
Yugoslav football managers
NK Olimpija Ljubljana (1945–2005) managers
NK Lokomotiva Zagreb managers
HNK Rijeka managers
FK Borac Banja Luka managers
Raufoss IL managers
Ethiopia national football team managers